is a town located in Iishi District, Shimane Prefecture, Japan.

It was formed on January 1, 2005 from the merger of the towns of Tonbara and Akagi, both from Iishi District.

As of March 1, 2017 the town has a population of 4,908 and a density of 20 persons per km².  The area is 242.84 km².

Geography
Located on the border of Shimane Prefecture and Hiroshima Prefecture, the Gōno River　flows to its west. The town is part of the Hiba-Dōgo-Taishaku Quasi-National Park.

Mountains: Mt. Oyorogi, Mt. Kotobiki,  Mt. Mengame

Rivers: Kando River, Tonbara River, Akana River, Ono River (Tributary of Kando River)

Lakes: Lake Kijima (Kijima Dam lake)

Subdivisions
 Akana 
 Kijima
 Oda
 Tani
 Tonbara, formerly part of Tonbara, Shimane

Surrounding municipalities 
 Shimane Prefecture
 Izumo
 Misato
 Unnan
 Ōda
 Hiroshima Prefecture
 Miyoshi

Climate 
Iinan has a humid subtropical climate (Köppen climate classification Cfa) with very warm summers and cool winters. Precipitation is abundant throughout the year.

Demographics
Per Japanese census data, the population of Iinan has decreased by more than half over the past 50 years.

Transportation

National Highways 
 National Highway 54 
 National Highway 184

Roadside Stations 
 Roadside Station Akagi Plateau
 Roadside Station Tonbara
There is no railroad access to Iinan.

Notable places 

Akana Castle
It is an old castle located on top of a hill in the Akana area of the town.
Mount Mengame
Situated on the border of Hiroshima Prefecture and Shimane Prefecture, Mount Mengame has an elevation of 830.3m. It is known for being the only place in the Chūgoku Region in which Luehdorfia are found.
Mount Kotobiki
Mount Kotobiki has an elevation of 1014m. Near the summit of the mountain is a small shrine and a forest of beech trees. The name "Kotobiki" comes from the traditional Japanese musical instrument, the koto.
Akana Marshland
The Akana Marshland is located in the Fukuda Area of the town, and is centered in Lake Nagao. It is known for having the largest forest of alders in the prefecture.
Kotobiki Camp Area
The Kotobiki Camp Area is located at the foot of Mount Kotobiki. It is open from late April to late October.

References

External links 

  

Towns in Shimane Prefecture